Herndon High School is a fully accredited four year public high school in Herndon, Virginia, United States.  Herndon serves grades 9-12 and is a part of the Fairfax County Public Schools (FCPS) system.  Herndon High School serves the town of Herndon and the northern part of the unincorporated community of Reston. Herndon's mascot is the Fighting Hornet.

History
Herndon High School opened in 1911 on Locust Street.
In 1930, seventy-one students enrolled, with classes such as economics, agriculture, and business education offered, with classes in industrial arts later offered. In 1942, the school opened the first school cafeteria in Fairfax County. In the early 1950s, the building was expanded to support more students.

In 1961, Herndon Intermediate School began within the Herndon High School building. In 1967, the High School moved to its current Bennett Street location, leaving Herndon Intermediate School at Locust Street with 650 students and 39 teachers.

At the start of the 2018–2019 school year Herndon boasted a student enrollment of 2,242 students and approximately 250 staff members.

Demographics
In the 2018–2019 school year, Herndon High School's student body was 32.43% White, 43.22% Hispanic, 12.62% Asian, 7.49% Black and 4.24% Other.

Sports
In 2009 the school's baseball field was named Alan McCullock Field for retiring baseball coach Alan McCullock, whose father has the same honor at Falls Church High School.

Notable alumni
Duncan Stroik (1980), Architect and Academic.
Bill Butler (1965), former MLB player (Kansas City Royals, Cleveland Indians, Minnesota Twins)
 Jon Carman (1994), former professional football player for the Buffalo Bills. All-American for Georgia Tech
 Ronnie Dove (1954), pop music singer in the 1960s, had hits such as Right or Wrong
 Angie Goff (1997), television weekend news anchor for WRC-TV
 Brandon Guyer (2004), former Herndon High and professional baseball player.  Played college baseball at UVA.
 Don Handfield (1989), filmmaker, producer and author
 Scottie Reynolds (2006), former point guard for Villanova University Wildcats, named a McDonald's All-American, Reynolds was named the 2006-07 Big East Rookie of the Year
 Mark Riddick (1994), illustrator, musician
Dave Lavery (1977), NASA Program Executive, FIRST Robotics Executive Advisory Board
Doug Kammerer (1993), chief meteorologist for WRC-TV
PFT Commenter, former Herndon High football player and James Madison University Rugby player, co-host of the most popular sports podcast in the US, Pardon My Take, for Barstool Sports

References

External links

Herndon, Virginia
High schools in Fairfax County, Virginia
Educational institutions established in 1911
Public high schools in Virginia
1911 establishments in Virginia